Life Under Water is a 1989 American made-for-television romantic comedy-drama film starring Sarah Jessica Parker, Joanna Gleason and Keanu Reeves. It was written by Richard Greenberg, based on his play. It was broadcast on the PBS television program American Playhouse on April 12, 1989.

Background
The play on which this telefilm is based, also titled Life Under Water, premiered Off-Broadway at the Ensemble Studio Theatre in May 1985. Directed by Don Scardino, the cast featured Alexa Kenin (Amy-Joy), Amanda Plummer (Amy-Beth), Andrew McCarthy (Kip), Jill Eikenberry (Jinx), and Larry Bryggman (Hank). The play takes place in the summer on Long Island's South Fork.

Plot
20 year old Kip moves out of his mother's home in the Hamptons, Long Island. His divorced mother, Jinx, is having an affair with Hank. Kip meets 2 young women on the beach—Amy-Beth and Amy-Joy. Amy-Joy insists that sea-monsters are real; Amy Beth has had a nervous breakdown. Both are selfishly preoccupied with their own lives.

References

External links 
 

1989 television films
1989 films
1980s romantic comedy-drama films
American romantic comedy-drama films
American films based on plays
American Playhouse
Plays by Richard Greenberg
American drama television films
1980s American films